Rubén Lira Aviles (22 October 1922 – 7 January 1983) was a Mexican gymnast. He competed in eight events at the 1948 Summer Olympics.

References

External links
 

1922 births
1983 deaths
Mexican male artistic gymnasts
Olympic gymnasts of Mexico
Gymnasts at the 1948 Summer Olympics
Pan American Games medalists in gymnastics
Pan American Games silver medalists for Mexico
Pan American Games bronze medalists for Mexico
Gymnasts at the 1951 Pan American Games
Medalists at the 1951 Pan American Games
20th-century Mexican people